The Beauty of Vice is a 1986 Yugoslav drama film directed by Živko Nikolić.

The film sold 866,474 tickets at the box office.

Cast 
 Mira Furlan - Jaglika
 Mima Karadžić - Luka
 Petar Božović - Žorž
 Alain Noury - Strani nudista
 Ines Kotman - Strana nudistkinja
 Mira Banjac - Milada

References

External links 
 

1986 films
1986 drama films
Serbian drama films
Yugoslav drama films
Films set in Yugoslavia
Films set in Montenegro